{{DISPLAYTITLE:H2N2O2}}
The molecular formula H2N2O2 (molar mass: 62.03 g/mol) may refer to:

 Hyponitrite ion
 Hyponitrous acid
 Nitramide

Inorganic molecular formulas